Nanakita Dam is a rock-filled dam in Izumi-ku, Sendai, Miyagi Prefecture, Japan, completed in 1984.

References 

Dams in Miyagi Prefecture
Dams completed in 1984
Buildings and structures in Sendai